The Jordan River (Aboriginal: kuta linah) is a perennial river located in the Midlands region of Tasmania, Australia.

Course and features
The river flows generally north, then west by south, joined by eight minor tributaries and passes by  before reaching its mouth at Herdsman's Cove and emptying into the Derwent River near . The river descends  over its  course.

The river is associated with aboriginal heritage; and the  East Derwent Highway crosses the river.

See also

Rivers of Tasmania

References

Midlands (Tasmania)
River Derwent (Tasmania)
South East Tasmania